Phaxas is a genus of small razor shells in the family Pharidae. Members of the genus have a pair of elongate valves and live in soft sediments on the sea bed. They have a muscular foot with which they can dig rapidly and a short siphon which they extend to the surface of the substrate. They are suspension feeders.

Species
The following species are recognised:
 Phaxas pellucidus (Pennant, 1777)
 Phaxas tenellus Cosel, 1993
Species brought into synonymy:
 Phaxas adriaticus (Coen, 1933): synonym of Phaxas pellucidus (Pennant, 1777)
 Phaxas cultellus (Linnaeus, 1758): synonym of Ensiculus cultellus (Linnaeus, 1758)
 Phaxas decipiens (E. A. Smith, 1904) accepted as Afrophaxas decipiens (E. A. Smith, 1904)

References

 Coen G. (1933). Molluschi nuovi di Rovigno. Note dell'Istituto Italo-Germanico di Biologia marina di Rovigno d'Istria, 6: 1-8, 1 pl.
 Vaught, K.C.; Tucker Abbott, R.; Boss, K.J. (1989). A classification of the living Mollusca. American Malacologists: Melbourne. ISBN 0-915826-22-4. XII, 195 pp.

External links
 Gray, J. E. (1852). Molluscorum Britanniae Synopsis: a synopsis of the Mollusca of Great Britain. John van Vorst, London, xvi, 376 pp

Bivalve genera
Pharidae